The Nationwide Volleyball Supercup for Women is a competition featuring professional women volleyball clubs from Albania, North Macedonia and Kosovo and consists in 4 teams playing in a direct elimination through semi-finals and the final. The team with the most trophies is KV Tirana of Albania with 1 cup*. They won the 2011 final against UMB Volley of Albania, played in Tiranë by scoreline 3-1.

Winners
These are the winners of the Nationwide Volleyball Supercup Women

Trophy Ranking

KV Tirana 1 time

 There are data missing for this tournament, updates will follow in the due course.

References

See also male competition
 Nationwide Volleyball Supercup

See also
 Albanian Volleyball Supercup (Women)
 Albanian Volleyball Cup (Women)
 Volleyball in Albania

Volleyball in Albania